Flavio Cipolla and Daniel Muñoz de la Nava were the defending champions but chose not to defend their title.

Nikola Mektić and Antonio Šančić won the title after defeating Juan Ignacio Galarza and Leonardo Mayer 7–5, 6–1 in the final.

Seeds

Draw

References
 Main Draw

Antonio Savoldi-Marco Co - Trofeo Dimmidisi - Doubles
Antonio Savoldi–Marco Cò – Trofeo Dimmidisì